Shanice Love (born 9 June 1997) is a Jamaican athlete specialising in the discus throw. She represented her country at the 2019 World Championships in Doha without reaching the final.

Her personal best in the event is 62.69 metres set in Austin, Texas, in 2019.

International competitions

References

1997 births
Living people
Jamaican female discus throwers
World Athletics Championships athletes for Jamaica
Athletes (track and field) at the 2019 Pan American Games
Pan American Games competitors for Jamaica
Florida State Seminoles women's track and field athletes
20th-century Jamaican women
21st-century Jamaican women